Abies magnifica, the red fir or silvertip fir, is a western North American fir, native to the mountains of southwest Oregon and California in the United States. It is a high-elevation tree, typically occurring at  elevation, though only rarely reaching tree line. The name red fir derives from the bark color of old trees.

Description
The bark on young trees is smooth, grey, and has resin blisters, becoming orange-red, rough and fissured on old trees. They are arranged spirally on the shoot, but twisted slightly S-shaped to be upcurved above the shoot.

Varieties
There are two, perhaps three varieties:
Most of the species' range, primarily in the Sierra Nevada.
The northwest of the species' range, in southwest Oregon and Shasta, Siskiyou and Trinity Counties in northwest California.

Related
Red fir is very closely related to Abies procera (noble fir), which replaces it further north in the Cascade Range. They are best distinguished by the leaves; noble fir leaves have a groove along the midrib on the upper side, while red fir does not show this. Red fir also tends to have the leaves less closely packed, with the shoot bark visible between the leaves, whereas the shoot is largely hidden in noble fir. Shasta red fir hybridizes with noble fir, with which it is both chemically and microscopically similar; some botanists treat the former as a natural hybrid between red and noble fir.

First recording
This tree was first recorded by William Lobb on his expedition to California of 1849–1853, having been overlooked previously by David Douglas.

Uses
The wood is used for general structural purposes and paper manufacture. It is also a popular Christmas tree.

Paiute peoples used the foliage of Shasta red fir (or perhaps noble fir) to treat coughs and colds.

See also
 Sierra Nevada subalpine zone

References

Further reading

External links

 USDA Forest Service: Abies magnifica
 CalFlora Database: Abies magnifica
 Gymnosperm Database – Abies magnifica
 Arboretum de Villardebelle: Abies magnifica Photos – group 1
 Arboretum de Villardebelle: Abies magnifica Photos – group 2

magnifica
Trees of the Northwestern United States
Flora of California
Flora of Nevada
Flora of Oregon
Flora of the Sierra Nevada (United States)
Flora of the Cascade Range
Flora of the Klamath Mountains
Natural history of Siskiyou County, California
Trees of North America
Trees of the Western United States
Trees of the West Coast of the United States
Trees of the United States